Dorand State Forest, also known as John Dorand State Forest, covers   in Grafton and Rockingham in Windham County, Vermont. The forest is managed by the Vermont Department of Forests, Parks, and Recreation. 

Activities in the forest include hiking, hunting, fishing, snowshoeing, trapping and wildlife viewing.

References

External links
Official website

Vermont state forests
Protected areas of Windham County, Vermont
Grafton, Vermont
Rockingham, Vermont